The British Computer Society Young Professionals Group (YPG) was formed in 1986 (although, its roots date back to around 1983) to provide representation and support to younger members of the IT profession.  Today the group is one of the largest and arguably one of the most influential young professionals groups in the UK, with over 26,000 members. The group organises events and provides services from lectures and debates to networking evenings, various competitions, college bursaries and awards.

Whilst support is provided from the British Computer Society, the group's leadership is run primarily by volunteers from the younger membership of the British Computer Society which form the YPG's Executive Committee and network of regional representatives.

Young IT Practitioner of the Year
The YPG judges, promotes and awards the Young IT Practitioner of the Year Award along with naming annual British Computer Society Medal Winners. This underlines one of the YPG's key roles to nurture and applaud individual ingenuity and entrepreneurial success that have made the British IT industry a leading global player. The awards mark the vital contribution made by young people to the IT profession.

Former winners of the award

 2010 — Meri Williams, Procter & Gamble
 2009 — Jacques Erasmus, Prevx
 2008 — Sarah Christie, Procter & Gamble
 2007 — Travers Powell, Vocalink
 2006 — Saqib Shaikh, Microsoft Corporation
 2005 — Andrew McAnulla, BTL Group Ltd
 2004 — Karen Elizabeth Petrie, NASA
 2003 — James Bailey, Eclipse Internet

Former medal winners

2010
 Adam Thompson, IBM UK Ltd
 Dominic Green, Microsoft

2009
 Luke Claughton, Micheldever Tyre Services Ltd
 Riyaz Patel, Yorkshire Water

2008
 Victoria O'Reilly, Allianz Insurance plc
 Luke Robison, IBM UK Ltd

2007
 Kate Scott, Premier Inn - Whitbread Group plc
 Chris Dale, IBM UK Ltd.

2006
 Paul Cheek, TeamSpirit Software Ltd
 Mark Alexander, Graham Technology Plc
 Iain McGinniss, Graham Technology Plc

2005
 Verity Wiscarson, IBM UK Ltd.
 Graham Marwick, IBM UK Ltd.
 Steven Henderson, Royal Bank of Scotland Group

2004
 Nicolas Eggleton, The Pensions Trust
 Lee Englestone, AstraZeneca
 Keith Sutcliffe, Steptronik UK

2003
 Richard Clayton, B Mason & Sons
 Steven Henderson, Royal Bank of Scotland Group
 David Hewitt, James Hamilton Group

SkillCentre

The YPG run an event series called 'YPG SkillCentre' these events tend to help attendees still in the earlier stages of their career explore and develop skill areas that are typically untaught and/or neglected in the IT industry, such as advice on body language and tips on how to negotiate a pay rise. The series established by YPG Chairman, Andrew Brown in 2003, has since trained hundreds of IT professionals.

Past events have included popular speakers such as the author of the Naked Leader, David Tayor, Chris Croft and Craig Goldblatt.

ProNetworking
ProNetworking is an event series established by YPG Chairman, Christopher Moxon in 2006 an expansion to the YPG SkillCentre event series and comprises events with two parts; offering attendees the opportunity to network whilst the second part brings together a top panel of IT professionals to share their secrets of success with the audience.

YPG OneTeam
YPG OneTeam was a project run by the YPG to consolidate the YPG's representation efforts at national and local levels.

WorkLink
Worklink was an online interactive database that allowed students to search for IT work placements. Notable employers using the service included, Buckingham Palace.

History of the group
The YPG was originally established by students from Thames Polytechnic (now the University of Greenwich) in 1984. By 1985, the group had over 250 members and in 1986 on 23 April the YPG's Constitution was ratified and the group held its inaugural conference organised by Barbara McManus.

Historical listing of Chairs of the YPG

See also
 Young professional

References

External links
YPG official website
Young Solicitors Group website
IRO Young Professionals website

Organizations established in 1984
Young Professionals Group

1986 establishments in the United Kingdom